Manaen may refer to:
 Manahen (also Manaen), teacher of the Church of Antioch and the foster brother of Herod Antipas
 King Manahem (fl. 8th century BC), king over Israel and the son of Gadi